Telesonix is a genus of flowering plants belonging to the family Saxifragaceae.

Its native range is Northern America.

Species:

Telesonix heucheriformis 
Telesonix jamesii

References

Saxifragaceae
Saxifragaceae genera